Posterior cutaneous may refer to:
 Posterior cutaneous nerve of arm
 Posterior cutaneous nerve of the forearm
 Posterior cutaneous nerve of thigh